Höffner is a furniture retailer in Germany.  A company of that name was founded in 1874 by Rudolf Höffner, and became Berlin's biggest furniture retailer before World War II. Based in the eastern part of Berlin, the company was discontinued after the war. In 1967 Kurt Krieger bought the right to the name "Höffner" and created a new company under that name. This company was initially based in Berlin-Wedding, but the headquarters moved to Schönefeld, Brandenburg after Germany's reunification. In January 2021, Höffner became the target of numerous protests in Kiel when it became known that compensatory land had been cut down during construction work on the Kiel store in November 2020. The company described the event as an "oversight."

Höffner's mascot is a man wearing a hat and a red bow tie named Höffi.

External links
 Hoeffner.de

References

Companies based in Brandenburg
Furniture retailers
Retail companies established in 1874
Retail companies of Germany
Dahme-Spreewald
German companies established in 1874